Brigida's woodcreeper (Hylexetastes brigidai), also known as the Mato Grosso woodcreeper, is a bird in the Dendrocolaptinae subfamily.

It is found in humid forests in the eastern Amazon in Brazil and Peru.

References

Brigida's woodcreeper
Birds of the Brazilian Amazon
Endemic birds of Brazil
Brigida's woodcreeper
Taxonomy articles created by Polbot
Taxobox binomials not recognized by IUCN